The 1915 Challenge Cup was the 19th staging of rugby league's oldest knockout competition, the Challenge Cup.

First round

Second round

Quarterfinals

Semifinals

Final

Huddersfield defeated St. Helens 37–3 in the Challenge Cup Final, on 1 May, held at Watersheddings, Oldham before a crowd of 8,000.

This was Huddersfield's second Challenge Cup win in as many Final appearances.

At one point St Helens' players refused to enter the field of play unless promised bonuses for reaching the final were paid by the Committee

St Helens team - 
1 Bert Roberts, 2 Tom Barton, 3 Jimmy Flanagan, 4 Tom White, 5 Henry Greenall, 6 Matt Creevey, 7 Fred Trenwith, 8 George Farrimond, 9 Sam Daniels – Try, 10 James Shallcross, 11 William Jackson, 12 Tom Durkin, 13 William Myers

References

Challenge Cup
Challenge Cup